Joseph Kwame Kumah (born 24 January 1974) is a Ghanaian politician who currently serves as the Member of the Parliament of Ghana for the Kintampo North Constituency.

Early life and education 
Kumah was born on 24 January 1974 and hails from Sugliboi in the Bono East Region of Ghana. He had his primary education in 1985. He also had his 'O' Level and 'A' Level education in 1991 and 1993 respectively. He further had his bachelor's degree in education in 1999. In 2010, he graduated with a post graduate certificate in Public Administration. He further had his Master of Arts degree in Local Government Administration and Organization from the Institute of Local Government Studies.

Career 
Kumah was a house master at the Ghana Education Service.

Political career 
Kumah is a member of the National Democratic Congress. He was elected as the member of parliament for Kintampo North Constituency in the Bono East Region of Ghana in the 2020 Ghanaian general elections. He won with 33,460 votes making 62.98% of the total votes cast whiles the NPP parliamentary candidate Micheal Sarkodie Baffoe had 16,499 votes making 31.05% of the total votes cast and an Independent candidate Francis Akwasi Owusu Boateng had 0 votes.

Committees 
Kumah is a member of the Judiciary Committee and also a member of the Education Committee.

Personal life 
Kumah is a Christian.

References 

Living people
National Democratic Congress (Ghana) politicians
Ghanaian MPs 2021–2025
1974 births